Nankai is a term in Chinese and Japanese. It may refer to:
 Nankai, a series of schools in China
 Nankai District, Tianjin, China
 Nankai Electric Railway, a railway company in Japan
 Nankai Club and Nankai Hawks,, former names of the Fukuoka SoftBank Hawks, a professional Japanese baseball team
 Nankai Broadcasting, a broadcasting company in Japan
 Nankai Trough, a submarine trough south of Japan
 Nankai megathrust earthquakes, a series of earthquakes that occur in and around the Nankai trough

See also 
 Nankaidō